Toki (sometimes Toki PDX or Toki Restaurant) is a Korean restaurant in Portland, Oregon.

Description 

Toki is a Korean restaurant in downtown Portland, "spun off" from Han Oak and specializing in bao bun burgers and "snacky" brunch specials. The menu is an expanded version of Han Oak's and includes bibimbap, bulgogi, dumplings, gimbap, Korean fried chicken, noodles, and a steamed bao burger. There are three varieties of Korean fried chicken: Korean-style hot chili oil, sweet garlic soy glaze, and Han Oak's "essence of instant ramen" seasoning blend intended to taste like instant noodle flavor packets. According to Willamette Week, the Gim-bap Supreme "takes its inspiration from both Taco Bell and the TikTok "wrap" trend, in which a tortilla is partially cut into four quadrants, topped with four different ingredients, folded into layers, and griddled". The Buldak-ra-Bboki has been described as a "creative mashup" of buldak and tteokbokki. The brunch menu has doughnuts and breakfast sandwiches, including a bao bun with everything bagel seasoning, koji-cured pork belly or a sausage patty, egg, and cheese. Dalgona coffee is also served.

History 
Peter Cho, chef and owner of the Korean restaurant Han Oak, and partner Sun Young Park opened Toki in January 2021, in the space which previously housed Tasty n Alder. Initially, the business operated via take-out during the COVID-19 pandemic.

Michael Russell of The Oregonian has said Toki was "fueled by tasty TikTok trends".

Reception 
Toki was included in several Eater Portland lists in 2021: Alex Frane included the restaurant in "17 Spots to Grab Amazing Breakfast Sandwiches", Nick Woo and Nick Townsend included the Korean fried chicken in "14 Real-Deal Fried Chicken Spots in Portland", and Zoe Baillargeon included the Buldak-ra-Bboki in "Where to Find the Cheesiest Dishes in Portland and Beyond". Additionally, the website's Brooke Jackson-Glidden said Toki "has become a must-visit spot for downtown brunch". The business was included in Eater Portland's 2022 overview of "Where to Eat and Drink in Downtown Portland".

Portland Monthly included the pork belly breakfast sandwich in a 2021 list of "11 Breakfast Sandwiches to Get You out of Bed". The magazine's Katherine Chew Hamilton also included the restaurant in an overview of the city's best fried chicken. Portland Monthly included the omurice in a 2022 list of "The 12 Best Breakfasts in Portland".

See also

 History of Korean Americans in Portland, Oregon
 List of Korean restaurants

References

External links 

 

2021 establishments in Oregon
Asian restaurants in Portland, Oregon
Korean restaurants in the United States
Korean-American culture in Portland, Oregon
Restaurants established in 2021
Southwest Portland, Oregon